Ali Al Shami (born 1945) is a Shia Lebanese academic and a member of the Amal movement. He was Lebanon's minister of foreign affairs and emigrants from 2009 to 2011.

Early life and education
Shami was born into a Shiite family in 1945. He received a bachelor's degree in political science from Lebanese University in 1970 and a diploma again in political science from the University of Grenoble in 1971 as well as  a PhD in political science from the same university in 1978.

Career
Shami is a retired university professor who taught in the college of law and political science at Lebanese University before becoming a member of the Amal movement.

He was part of the committee in charge of writing a program for action of the government led by Prime Minister Saad Hariri in November 2009. He was appointed minister of foreign affairs and emigrants to the cabinet led by Hariri on 9 November 2009. He was named to this post by the Amal leader and Hezbollah ally Parliament Speaker Nabih Berri. He succeeded Fawzi Salloukh as foreign minister. In the cabinet, Shami was part of opposition and a member of the Amal Movement and one of the five Shiite members in the cabinet. Shami's tenure ended in June 2011, and he was replaced by Adnan Mansour in the post.

References

External links

1945 births
Amal Movement politicians
Foreign ministers of Lebanon
Grenoble Alpes University alumni
Lebanese political scientists
Lebanese Shia Muslims
Lebanese University alumni
Academic staff of Lebanese University
Living people
People from Nabatieh District